Brutus is an unincorporated community and census-designated place (CDP) in Emmet County in the U.S. state of Michigan. As of the 2010 census, the CDP had a population of 218.  Brutus is located within Maple River Township.

It was established with the building of an inn called the Brutus House in 1874.

Geography
Brutus is located in eastern Emmet County, near the center of Maple River Township. US Highway 31 passes through the center of Brutus, leading north  to Pellston and south  to Alanson. Petoskey, the Emmet County seat, is  southbound on US 31.

The community of Brutus was listed as a newly-organized census-designated place for the 2010 census, meaning it now has officially defined boundaries and population statistics for the first time.

Education
In much of the CDP, the school district is Alanson Public Schools. In northern parts, the district is Pellston Public Schools.

Demographics

References 

Unincorporated communities in Michigan
Unincorporated communities in Emmet County, Michigan
Census-designated places in Emmet County, Michigan
Census-designated places in Michigan
Populated places established in 1874
1874 establishments in Michigan